The Kuttenbach is a 5.3 kilometre-long, orographically left-hand tributary of the Urft in North Rhine-Westphalia, Germany, in the municipality of Kall.

Geography 
From here on the stream flows constantly northeastwards and, after a short distance, reaches the village of Diefenbach. Its valley then separates the villages of Gillenberg on the right and Steinfelderheistert on the left. Soon is slopes become wooded and, on the right, is the nature reserve of Laubwald am Kuttenbach below the village of Steinfeld with Steinfeld Abbey on the upper step of the hillside. The stream finally empties from the left into the Urft  between the villages of Urft and Sötenich at river kilometre 22.3.

References

External links
 
 

Rivers of North Rhine-Westphalia
Rivers of the Eifel
Euskirchen (district)
Rivers of Germany